The governor of Ilocos Norte, is the chief executive of the provincial government of Ilocos Norte.

List of governors of Ilocos Norte (1971–present)

References

Governors of Ilocos Norte
Ilocos Norte